Hindon River, a tributary of Yamuna river, is a river in India that originates in the Saharanpur district, from the Shakumbhari devi range Upper Sivaliks in Uttar Pradesh.

It flows between Ganges and Yamuna rivers for  through Muzaffarnagar district, Meerut district, Baghpat district, Ghaziabad district and Gautam Buddh Nagar district before it joins Yamuna river at Sector-150, Noida. The Hindon Air Force Base of the Indian Air Force also lies on its bank in the Ghaziabad district on the outskirts of Delhi.

Tributary
Kali river, which originates in the Rajaji Range of Sivalik Hills and travels about  passing  through Saharanpur, Muzaffarnagar, Meerut and Bagpat districts, merges with Hindon River, before it merges with the Yamuna River. The Kali river is also highly polluted and adds to the pollution of the Hindon, as it passes through a populated and industrial belt of Uttar Pradesh.

Mythology
Near Sardhana lies the ancient Mahadev Temple that is believed to be dating from the Mahabharata period, and where the Pandavas prayed before leaving for the Lakshagrih, the notorious palace made of lac by Duryodhana, at the confluence of the Hindon (previously known as Harnandi) and Krishna rivers (Kali River, Kali Nadi) at Varnavrat, the present Barnava, and where the prince resided with their mother Kunti.

History
An Indus Valley civilization (fl. 3300–1300 BCE) site, Alamgirpur is located along the Hindon River,  from Delhi.

During 1857–58, Ghaziabad city was a scene of fighting during the Indian Mutiny, when Indian soldiers in the Bengal Army that were under the British East India Company mutinied but soon turned into a widespread uprising against British rule in India. The Hindon River, in particular, was the site of several skirmishes between Indian troops and British soldiers in 1857 including the Battle of Badli-ki-Serai and today, the graves of the British soldiers and officers can still be seen. Ghaziabad's place in Northern Indian history is assured by the birth of many freedom fighters who played a role in various revolutions all dedicated to the attainment of freedom for all who have lived – and are still living – there.

Hindon Vahini
The industries of western Uttar Pradesh discharge their effluents, often with no treatment, directly into the Hindon 
River. This heavy loading characterizes the presence of toxic contaminants and for the biological diversity of river ecology.  Dissolved oxygen levels are zero throughout the length of this river.

But now many NGOs have come forward to rejuvenate this river. Abhiyans like Hindon Kali and Krishna Bachao Abhiyan are held by locals. NGOs with RWA are working to aware local and trying to remove solid non-biodegradable wastes like plastic from the river. Now, farming is reducing chemical fertilizes and pesticides near the flood plains.

References

External links 
 Article on pollution level in Hindon River
 Hindon river joining Yamuna river wikimapia

Rivers of Uttar Pradesh
Tributaries of the Yamuna River
Rivers of Delhi
Rivers of India